Josua or Jozua is a male given name and a variation of the Hebrew name Yeshua. Notable people with this name include:

Josua Bühler (1895–1983), Swiss philatelist
Josua de Grave (1643–1712), Dutch draughtsman and painter
Josua Harrsch (1669–1719), German missionary
Josua Hoffalt (born 1984), French ballet dancer
Josua Järvinen (1871–1948), Finnish politician
Josua Koroibulu (born 1982), Fijian rugby league footballer
Josua Heschel Kuttner (–1878), Jewish Orthodox scholar and rabbi
Josua Lindahl (1844–1912), Swedish-American geologist and paleontologist
Josua Maaler (1529–1599), Swiss pastor and lexicographer
Josua Mateinaniu, Fijian missionary
Josua Mejías (born 1997), Venezuelan footballer
Johann Josua Mosengel (1663–1731), German pipe organ builder
Jozua Naudé (disambiguation), several people
Josua Swanepoel (born 1983), South African cricketer
Josua Tuisova (born 1994), Fijian rugby union player
Josua Vakurunabili (born 1992), Fijian rugby union player
Josua Vici (born 1994), Fijian rugby union player

See also

 Joshua (name)

References

Given names